For the municipality, see: the Rural Municipality of Alexander

Alexander, Manitoba is an unincorporated community recognized as a local urban district on Highway 1 west of Brandon located in the Rural Municipality of Whitehead.

The post office opened on 10-10-21W as Pulteney in 1882. It became Alexander Station in 1885 and was moved to 17-10-21W and changed to Alexander in 1891. It was made a rail point on the Canadian Pacific Railway in 1882. The community was named for an early settler named Alexander Speers.

The community's closest city is Brandon and their school is part of the Brandon School Division.

Demographics 

References 

 Geographic Names of Manitoba (pg. 7) - the Millennium Bureau of Canada
 Alexander School

Designated places in Manitoba
Local urban districts in Manitoba
Unincorporated communities in Westman Region